The Hungry Lion is a 2017 Japanaese drama film directed by , starring Urara Matsubayashi, Atomu Mizuishi, Mariko Tsutsui,  and Sakiko Kato.

Cast
 Urara Matsubayashi as Hitomo Sugimoto
 Atomu Mizuishi as Hiroki Fujigawa
 Mariko Tsutsui as Yuko Sugimoto
  as Nanami Oda
 Sakiko Kato as Moe Sasaki
 Tomomi Sugai as Misaki Kinoshita
  as Asuka Sugimoto
  as Tetsuya Kondo
  as Tsuyoshi Hosono
  as Kohei Nishijima
  as Atsushi Togawa

Release
The film premiered at the 2017 Tokyo International Film Festival on 27 October.

Reception
Justin Lowe of The Hollywood Reporter called the film a "timely critique that will doubtless fall on deaf ears."

Mark Schilling of The Japan Times rated the film 4 stars out of 5 and wrote that with "cool restraint and precision" it "illustrates the process by which the internet destroys, celebrates and forgets a young life touched by scandal."

References

External links
 
 

Japanese drama films
2017 drama films